Vyacheslav Anatolyevich Kirillov (born 20 June 1989) is a former Russian professional football player.

Club career
He played three seasons in the Russian Football National League for FC Metallurg-Kuzbass Novokuznetsk, FC Baikal Irkutsk and FC Baltika Kaliningrad.

External links
 
 

1989 births
People from Bratsk
Living people
Russian footballers
Association football forwards
FC Novokuznetsk players
FC Baikal Irkutsk players
FC Baltika Kaliningrad players
FC Smena Komsomolsk-na-Amure players
FC Chita players
Sportspeople from Irkutsk Oblast